Amaqua Township is one of seventeen townships in Boone County, Iowa, USA.  As of the 2000 census, its population was 283.

History
Amaqua Township was established in 1871. Amaqua is an Indian name meaning "beaver".

Geography
According to the USGS, it contains four cemeteries: Beaver, Grand Ridge, Maas and Maple Grove.

References

External links
 US-Counties.com
 City-Data.com

Townships in Boone County, Iowa
Townships in Iowa
1871 establishments in Iowa